Rugby New York, formerly known as Rugby United New York and now officially nicknamed the Ironworkers, are a professional rugby union team based in New York City that is a member of Major League Rugby (MLR). The team played an exhibition season in spring 2018 and joined MLR for its second full season in 2019. The team was founded by James Kennedy.

In 2022, its first season under the Rugby New York name, the team made its first MLR Final appearance, winning a title in front of 1,979 attendees at Red Bull Arena in nearby Harrison, New Jersey.

History 
Rugby United New York was founded on April 2018 by James Kennedy, owner of Murphy Kennedy Group a New York construction management company and active rugby player at the time.In its 2018 exhibition season, RUNY was led by former USA men's national team coach Mike Tolkin, and assistant coaches Bruce McLane (former coach of New York Athletic Club RFC), Andrew Britt, and Vili Vakasisikakala. The team's 2018 spring season consisted of matches against the Ontario Arrows and the Mystic River Rugby Club of Boston. The team played its home matches at Gaelic Park in The Bronx. The team played its first match on March 17, 2018, at Mazzella Field in New Rochelle, New York. New York defeated the Ontario Arrows by a score of 36–19. RUNY played its first match in New York City against Mystic River on March 24 before a sold-out crowd at Gaelic Park. New York defeated Mystic River by a score of 50–0.

Ahead of the 2019 season, RUNY announced that they had retained Mike Tolkin as the team's head coach, signed Kees Lensing as the team's forwards coach, and named James English as general manager.

On November 7, 2018, RUNY announced that MCU Park in Brooklyn would be their home field for their first full season.

Broadcasts
2019 and 2020 home games were shown on SportsNet New York (SNY). Matt McCarthy, John Broker and Steve Lewis were the on air talent.

The 2021 season matches was broadcast on MSG Networks, ending their contract with SNY.

Sponsorship
During the inaugural season, RUNY signed a partnership deal with Magners Irish Cider, the official drink partner and Bawnmore Irish Beef Jerky as the official snack partner for the 2019 season. They also partnered up with EVF Performance, the team's official gym and Motion PT Group, named the official physical therapy partner for the team.

For the 2021 season, RUNY partnered with Sword Performance, a sports drink hydration company. They also partnered with Mainfreight as their shirt sponsor for the next two seasons.

Roster 

The Rugby New York squad for the 2023 Major League Rugby season is:

 Senior 15s internationally capped players are listed in bold.
 MLR teams are allowed to field up to ten overseas players per match.

Head coaches
  Mike Tolkin (2018–2019)
  Greg McWilliams (2020)
  Marty Veale (2021–2022)
  James Semple (2022–present)

Captains
 Mike Petri (2019)
 Dylan Fawsitt (2020–2021)
 Nate Brakeley (2022–present)

Records

Season standings

Honors

Head to Head

The following table details the past performance of Rugby United New York against different opponents in Major League Rugby, between their inaugural season of 2019 up until the current 2022 season (Updated after MLR Final(MLR 2022 season) 25 June). Table includes all regular season and play-off matches (semi-finals and finals).

2018 season
All games in the 2018 season were exhibition games and did not count in the league standings.

2019 season

Exhibitions

Regular season

Post season

2020 season

Exhibition

Regular season

On March 12, 2020, MLR announced the season would go on hiatus immediately for 30 days due to fears surrounding the 2019–2020 coronavirus pandemic.  It was cancelled the following week

2021 season

Regular season

Post season

2022 season

Regular season

Post season

References

External links 
 

 
Major League Rugby teams
2018 establishments in New York City
Rugby clubs established in 2018
Rugby union teams in New York City
Rugby union teams in New York (state)
Sports teams in New York City